Edwin Max (born 23 August 1969 in The Hague) is a former Dutch darts player. He used the nickname Mad Max for his matches.

Career

Max made his first World Championship debut in 2008 as a member of the British Darts Organisation, losing in the first round to eventual finalist Simon Whitlock. Max reached the last 16 of the 2007 Winmau World Masters, with notable wins over Brian Woods and 2006 British Open finalist Mark Barilli before losing to Ted Hankey. He reached the final of the 2007 Swiss Open, losing to fellow Dutchman Co Stompé.

In his second appearance at the Lakeside for the 2009 BDO World Darts Championship, Max beat Krzysztof Ratajski 3-2 in round one, before losing 4-0 to Tony O'Shea in round two.

World Championship Results

British Darts Organisation

2008: 1st Round (lost to Simon Whitlock 0-3)
2009: 2nd Round (lost to Tony O'Shea 0-4)

External links
Edwin Max's profile at Darts Database

1969 births
Living people
Dutch darts players
Sportspeople from The Hague
British Darts Organisation players
Professional Darts Corporation former tour card holders